Louise of Savoy (Louise Christine; 1 August 1627 – 7 July 1689) was a Savoyard Princess by birth. She was the mother of Louis, Margrave of Baden-Baden, the famous chief commander of the Imperial army.

Biography

Louise was born at the Hôtel de Soissons in Paris. The Hôtel was the birthplace of her mother, a granddaughter of Louis de Bourbon, an uncle of Henry IV of France. Her father was Prince Thomas Francis of Savoy, the younger son of the Duke of Savoy and his Spanish wife, Infanta Catherine Michelle of Spain.

She married Margrave Ferdinand Maximilian of Baden-Baden (1625–1669) on 15 March 1653 at the Église Saint-Sulpice, Paris, France. The church was near the Hôtel de Soissons. The marriage contract was signed on the same day and is today preserved in the Parisian Institut de France. This marriage was negotiated by none other than the famous Cardinal Mazarin and the Ambassador of the Margrave of Baden-Baden one Monsieur Krebs. Her husband was the Hereditary Prince of Baden-Baden, this meant that he was the Heir apparent of his father Wilhelm, Margrave of Baden-Baden. 

Marriages between German and Savoyard nobles were common in an era when many Savoyard nobles lived in German states notably Baden itself, due to official charges in the country. 

The marriage was not successful. Louise Christine of Savoy refused to leave the refined French court and follow her husband to Baden-Baden. Louise Christine gave birth to a son on April 8, 1655 named Louis William of Baden-Baden. He was named after the French King Louis XIV, who was his godfather. 

Ferdinand Maximilian then abducted his son from Paris and brought him to Baden-Baden. Ferdinand ordered a Savoyard man named Charles Maurice de Lassolaye, who had access to the Hôtel de Soissons, to smuggle his three-month-old son out of Paris and take him to be raised in Baden-Baden. As a consequence Louis William was not raised by his mother, but by his grandfather's second wife Maria Magdalena of Oettingen-Baldern. 

When it was clear that Louise Christine would not leave Paris, some said due to the influence of her mother, Louise Christine and her husband decided to separate and let her son be raised in Baden-Baden. 

She died in Paris aged 61. 

Her descendants included the present Henri d'Orléans, French pretender; the Prince Napoléon; Duarte Pio, Duke of Braganza and his distant cousin Prince Luiz of Orléans-Braganza. She is also an ancestor of the ruling Felipe VI of Spain, Henri, Grand Duke of Luxembourg and Albert II of Belgium.

Ancestors

1627 births
1689 deaths
Nobility from Paris
Princesses of Savoy
Hereditary Princesses of Baden-Baden
House of Zähringen
French people of Spanish descent
French people of Italian descent
French people of Portuguese descent
French people of English descent
French people of Polish descent
French people of Austrian descent
House of Savoy-Carignano